The 2005 Tennis Masters Cup was a tennis tournament played on indoor carpet courts. It was the 36th edition of the year-end singles championships, the 31st edition of the year-end doubles championships, and was part of the 2005 ATP Tour. It took place at the Qizhong Forest Sports City Arena in Shanghai, China, from November 13 through November 20, 2005.

Finals

Singles

 David Nalbandian defeated  Roger Federer 6–7(4–7), 6–7(11–13), 6–2, 6–1, 7–6(7–3)
It was Nalbandian's 2nd title of the year, and his 4th overall. It was his 1st career year-end championships title.

Doubles

 Michaël Llodra /  Fabrice Santoro defeated  Leander Paes /  Nenad Zimonjić 6–7(6–8), 6–3, 7–6(7–4)

Points and prize money

RR is points or prize money won in the round robin stage.
1 Prize money for doubles is per team.
2 Participation fee for 1 RR match is $45,000 and for 2 RR matches is $70,000.
An undefeated singles champion would earn the maximum 750 points and $1,520,000 in prize money ($120,000 participation, $360,000 undefeated round robin, $370,000 semifinal win, $700,000 final win)
An undefeated doubles champion would earn the maximum 750 points and $220,000 in prize money ($50,000 participation, $45,000 undefeated round robin, $25,000 semifinal win, $100,000 final win). While each of them would get 1,500 points, the $220,000 would be split, so $110,000 for each member of the team.

Points breakdown

Singles

Doubles

1 Huss and Moodie qualified due to winning Wimbledon and a top 20 finish according to the rules

References

External links
Official website
Singles Finals Draw
Singles round robin draw (Red Group)
Singles round robin draw (Gold Group)
Doubles Finals Draw
Doubles round robin draw (Red Group)
Doubles round robin draw (Gold Group)

 
Tennis Masters Cup
2005
Tennis tournaments in China
Sports competitions in Shanghai
2005 in Chinese tennis